Friendly Societies Act (with its variations) is a stock short title used in New Zealand and the United Kingdom for legislation relating to friendly societies.

List

New Zealand
The Friendly Societies Act 1856 (19 & 20 Vict No 28) 
The Friendly Societies Act 1867 (31 Vict No 27) 
The Friendly Societies Act 1877 (41 Vict No 10)
The Friendly Societies Act Amendment Act 1878 (42 Vict No 23)
The Friendly Societies Act 1882 (46 Vict No 36) 
The Friendly Societies Act 1882 Amendment Act 1886 (50 Vict No 6) 
The Friendly Societies Act 1882 Amendment Act 1892 
The Friendly Societies Act 1909 (9 Edw 7 No 12)  
The Friendly Societies Amendment Act 1911 (2 Geo 5 No 5) 
The Friendly Societies Amendment Act 1914 (5 Geo 5 No 47) 
The Friendly Societies Amendment Act 1915 (6 Geo 5 No 64) 
The Friendly Societies Amendment Act 1922 (13 Geo 5 No 56) 
The Friendly Societies Amendment Act 1948 (No 23) 
The Friendly Societies Amendment Act 1949 (No 30) 
The Friendly Societies Amendment Act 1953 (No 62) 
The Friendly Societies Amendment Act 1954 (No 44) 
The Friendly Societies Amendment Act 1957 (No 50) 
The Friendly Societies Amendment Act 1959 (No 64) 
The Friendly Societies Amendment Act 1961 (No 112) 
The Friendly Societies Amendment Act 1962 (No 70) 
The Friendly Societies Amendment Act 1963 (No 89) 
The Friendly Societies Amendment Act 1964 (No 88) 
The Friendly Societies Amendment Act 1968 (No 83) 
The Friendly Societies Amendment Act 1970 (No 63) 
The Friendly Societies Amendment Act 1972 (No 61) 
The Friendly Societies Amendment Act 1973 (No 63) 
The Friendly Societies Amendment Act 1975 (No 21) 
The Friendly Societies Amendment Act 1977 (No 152) 
The Friendly Societies and Credit Unions Act 1982 (No 118) 
The Friendly Societies and Credit Unions Amendment Act 1985 (No 118) 
The Friendly Societies and Credit Unions Amendment Act (No 2) 1985 (No 177) 
The Friendly Societies and Credit Unions Amendment Act 1987 (No 142) 
The Friendly Societies and Credit Unions Amendment Act 2004 (No 28) 
The Friendly Societies and Credit Unions Amendment Act 2006 (No 65) 
The Friendly Societies and Credit Unions Amendment Act 2007 (No 59)

United Kingdom
The Revenue, Friendly Societies, and National Debt Act 1882 (45 & 46 Vict c 72)
The Friendly Societies Act 1896 (59 & 60 Vict c 25)
The Friendly Societies Act 1908 (8 Edw 7 c 32)
The Friendly Societies Act 1924 (14 & 15 Geo 5 c 11)
The Industrial Assurance and Friendly Societies Act 1929 (19 & 20 Geo 5 c 28)
The Industrial Assurance and Friendly Societies Act 1948 (11 & 12 Geo 6 c 39)
The Friendly Societies Act 1955 (4 & 5 Eliz 2 c 19)
The Industrial Assurance and Friendly Societies Act 1948 (Amendment) Act 1958 (6 & 7 Eliz 2 c 27)
The Friendly and Industrial and Provident Societies Act 1968 (c 55)
The Friendly Societies Act 1971 (c 66)
The Friendly Societies Act 1974 (c 46)
The Friendly Societies Act 1981 (c 50)
The Friendly Societies Act 1984 (c 62)
The Friendly Societies Act 1992 (c 40)
The Industrial Assurance and Friendly Societies Act (Northern Ireland) 1948 (c 22) (NI)
The Friendly Societies Act (Northern Ireland) 1957 (c 1) (NI)
The Friendly Societies Act (Northern Ireland) 1970 (c 31) (NI)

The Friendly Societies Acts 1875 to 1895 was the collective title of the following Acts:
The Friendly Societies Act 1875 (38 & 39 Vict c 60)
The Friendly Societies Act 1887 (50 & 51 Vict c 56)
The Friendly Societies Act 1889 (52 & 53 Vict c 22)
The Friendly Societies Act 1893 (56 & 57 Vict c 30)
The Friendly Societies Act 1895 (58 & 59 Vict c 26)

See also
List of short titles

References

Lists of legislation by short title